The pubofemoral ligament (pubocapsular ligament) is a ligament on the inferior side of the hip joint.

This ligament is attached, above, to the obturator crest and the superior ramus of the pubis; below, it blends with the capsule and with the deep surface of the vertical band of the iliofemoral ligament. This ligament prevents hyper-abduction of the hip joint.

References

External links
 
  hip/hip%20ligaments/ligaments5 at the Dartmouth Medical School's Department of Anatomy

Ligaments of the lower limb